Wild Pumpkins at Midnight was an Australian blues/roots rock band which formed in Tasmania in 1984, with Debra Manskey on vocals and guitar, Dan Tuffy on bass guitar and vocals and Michael Turner on guitar and vocals.

The band relocated to Melbourne in 1987, Manskey left before they moved on to London in 1990 and Ashley Davies joined on drums. They subsequently shifted to the Netherlands, in 1993 Davies returned to Australia and was replaced by Greg Hynes and Nick Larkins joined on guitar. The band returned to Australia for touring and recording in late 1995 and again in 1997, but spent the majority of their time in Europe. They toured extensively in both Europe and Australia, including a spot on the 1996 Big Day Out and released nine albums under various labels before disbanding in 1998.

At the ARIA Music Awards of 1990 they won the ARIA Award for Best Independent Release.

History

Formation and early years
In 1984, Tasmanians, Debra Manskey on vocals and guitar and Michael Turner on vocals and guitar joined with New South Wales-born Dan Tuffy on bass guitar and vocals to form Wild Pumpkins at Midnight. They played blues/roots rock and their debut single, "Birth of a Nation" was released early in 1987 on WPAM, it was followed in March by 10-track cassette, Scenesville on Dex. They relocated to Melbourne and signed with Major Records in 1987 and released, Wild Pumpkins at Midnight, a five-track EP in 1988. After signing with Sydney label, Mighty Boy, they released "Watermelon Patch" as a single in March 1989 followed by albums Living in April 1989 and This Machine Is Made of People in August.

In 1990, at the Australian Recording Industry Association (ARIA) Music Awards, they won 'Best Independent Release' for their album This Machine Is Made of People. Little Victories was released in 1990, Manskey left prior to the band relocating to London in June with new drummer, Ashley Davies.

London and Amsterdam
Wild Pumpkins at Midnight had relocated to London by June 1990, they subsequently moved to Amsterdam, Netherlands and then were based in the village of Wageningen. Their first European release was a four-track CD EP, Sending a Vampire on MDS in October 1992 and was followed by albums, Strangeways (Current/MDS, April 1993) and Going Sick (Current/MDS, April 1994). In 1993, Davies had returned to Australia and was replaced by Greg Hynes and guitarist Nick Larkins had joined. From their base in Wageningen they toured a dozen European countries, including several tours to former Eastern Bloc states including Czech Republic, Slovak Republic, Hungary and Poland. They also performed in Former Yugoslavia during the war.

Later years
The group returned to Melbourne in 1995 and released, Low-Fi Lucy's Mobile Temple in November on Way Over There. They toured Australia including Big Day Out in 1996, Sad Trees followed in July which had both studio and live tracks. In February 1997, Hot Records released a compilation, The Secret of the Sad Tree ahead of their European tour from June. At the conclusion of the tour, in 1998, Wild Pumpkins at Midnight disbanded.

Members
Debra Manskey – vocals, guitar (1984–1990)
Dan Tuffy – bass guitar, vocals (1984–1998)
Michael Turner – vocals, guitar (1984–1998)
Ashley Davies – drums (1990–1993)
Greg Hynes – drums (1993–1998)
Nick Larkins – guitar (1993–1998)

Discography

Albums

Awards and nominations

ARIA Music Awards
The ARIA Music Awards are a set of annual ceremonies presented by Australian Recording Industry Association (ARIA), which recognise excellence, innovation, and achievement across all genres of the music of Australia. They commenced in 1987.

! 
|-
| 1990
| This Machine Is Made of People
| ARIA Award for Best Independent Release
| 
|

References

ARIA Award winners
Musical groups disestablished in 1998
Musical groups established in 1984
Tasmanian musical groups